Shirk ( širk) in Islam is the sin of idolatry or polytheism (i.e., the deification or worship of anyone or anything besides God). Islam teaches that God does not share his divine attributes with anyone. Associating partners with God is disallowed according to the Islamic doctrine of Tawhid (oneness). Mušrikūn  (pl. of mušrik  ) are those who practice shirk, which literally means "association" and refers to accepting other gods and divinities alongside God (as God’s "associates"). The Qur'an considers shirk as a sin that will not be forgiven if a person dies without repenting of it.

Etymology 
The word širk comes from the Arabic root Š-R-K, with the general meaning of "to share".
In the context of the Quran, the particular sense of "sharing as an equal partner" is usually understood, so that polytheism means "attributing a partner to Allah". In the Quran, shirk and the related word mušrikūn—those who commit shirk and plot against Islam—often refer to the enemies of Islam (as in At-Tawbah verses 9:1–15).

Quran

Worship of anything but Allah

Indeed, Allah does not forgive associating others with Him ˹in worship˺, but forgives anything else of whoever He wills. And whoever associates others with Allah has indeed committed a grave sin. ---4:48

According to the Encyclopedia of Islam, the Quran states "twice", in surah an-Nisa, verses 48 and 116, "that God can pardon all sins save one", that of shirk ("associationism"). 
Islamic commentators on the Quran have emphasized that pre-Islamic Arabic idolatry made a number of godlings, most memorably the three goddesses Manāt, Al-Lāt and Al-‘Uzzá, equal associates of Allah (as the Quran discusses in the 53rd surat) and the word mushrikūn (singular: mushrik) is often translated into English as "polytheists".

The Quran and what the people of Nuh's community would say in an effort by the idolaters to ignore and mock Nuh. "They (idolaters) have said: "You shall not leave your gods nor shall you leave Wadd, nor Suwa', nor Yaghuth, nor Ya'uq nor Nasr." (Quran 71:23)

Other forms of shirk include the worship of wealth and other material objects. This is pointed out in the Quran in Al-A'raf in one of the stories of the Children of Israel, when they took a calf made of gold for worship, and for which Moses ordered them to repent.

Entities worshipped besides God are called shuraka. Although the existence of such entities is not denied, as they can accept sacrifices, their divinity is. After Judgement Day, they will be cast into hell along shayatin and evil jinn, whom the pagans are said to likewise sacrifice in order to gain protection.

Obey or heed anything but Allah

They have taken their rabbis and monks as well as the Messiah, son of Mary, as lords besides Allah, even though they were commanded to worship none but One God. There is no god ˹worthy of worship˺ except Him. Glorified is He above what they associate ˹with Him˺! ---9:31

Another form of shirk mentioned in the Quran At-Tawbah is to take rabbis, monks, prophets, priests, theologians, scholars of religion, religious lawyers, or shaitans as Lord(s) in practice by following their doctrines, and/or by following their rulings on what is lawful when it is at variance to the law or doctrines prescribed by Allah's revelation.

Children obeying their parents is obligatory when the 3 conditions are met:
The request is permissible in Islam. (e.g. the parents cannot command the child to drink alcohol or eat pork)
The request is for the wellbeing of the parents. (e.g. the parents are elderly and no one is there to care for them, their request for the child to stay with them is valid)
The child can do it without undue hardship. (e.g. divorcing your spouse will cause you and your family undue hardship, the request of the parents can be denied without guilt)

Theological interpretation
Medieval Muslim and Jewish philosophers identified belief in the Trinity with the heresy of shirk in Arabic (shituf in Hebrew), meaning "associationism", in limiting the infinity of God by associating his divinity with physical existence.

In a theological context, one commits shirk by associating some lesser being with Allah. The sin is committed if one imagines that there is a partner with Allah whom it is suitable to worship. It is stated in the Quran: "Allah forgives not that partners should be set up with Him, but He forgives anything else, to whom He pleases, to set up partners with Allah is to devise a sin most heinous indeed" (Quran An-Nisa 4:48).

Some followers of a Sufistic interpretation of Islam tend to regard the belief in any power other than God as a type of polytheism (shirk). That includes false gods but also the belief in other sources of existence. Beliefs usually accepted by monotheism, such as a devil as a source of evil or free will as source for God's creation's own responsibilities, are equated with beliefs in other powers than God and therefore denounced.

The status of the People of the Book (ahl al-kitab), particularly Jews and Christians, with respect to the Islamic notions of unbelief is not clearcut. Charles Adams writes that the Quran reproaches the People of the Book with kufr for rejecting Muhammad's message when they should have been the first to accept it as possessors of earlier revelations, and he singles out Christians for disregarding the evidence of God's unity. The Quranic verse Al-Ma'idah 5:73  ("Certainly they disbelieve [kafara] who say: God is the third of three"), among other verses, has been traditionally understood in Islam as rejection of the Christian Trinity doctrine, but modern scholarship has suggested alternative interpretations. Other Quranic verses strongly deny the deity of Jesus Christ, the son of Mary, and reproach the people who treat Jesus as equal with God as disbelievers, who will be doomed to eternal punishment in Hell. The Quran also does not recognise the attribute of Jesus as the Son of God or God himself but respects Jesus as a prophet and messenger of God, who was sent to children of Israel. Some Muslim thinkers such as Mohamed Talbi have viewed the most extreme Qur'anic presentations of the dogmas of the Trinity and divinity of Jesus (Al-Ma'idah 5:19, 5:75-76, 5:119) as non-Christian formulas, which were rejected by the Church.

Cyril Glasse criticises the use of kafirun [pl. of kafir] to describe Christians as a "loose usage". According to the Encyclopaedia of Islam, traditional Islamic jurisprudence has ahl al-kitab being "usually regarded more leniently than other kuffar [pl. of kafir]," and "in theory," a Muslim commits a punishable offense if he says to a Jew or a Christian, "Thou unbeliever."

Historically, People of the Book permanently residing under Islamic rule were entitled to a special status known as dhimmi, and those who were visiting Muslim lands received a different status known as musta'min.

Greater and lesser shirk
The term shirk is used in two senses : to mean both polytheism and something that is not polytheism but a certain form of sin.
Shirk has been classified into two categories according to Islam:
 Greater shirk (Shirk-al-Akbar): open and apparent
 Lesser shirk (Shirk-al-Asghar): concealed or hidden

Greater shirk
Greater shirk or Shirk-al-Akbar means open polytheism and has been described in two forms:
 To associate anyone with Allah as his partner (to believe in more than one god)
 To associate Allah's attributes with someone else (to believe anything or anyone other than God has divine attributes)

Ibn Taymiyyh and Salafis

Other interpretations divide greater shirk into three main categories. According to Salafis Shirk can be committed by acting against the three different categories. Ibn Taymiyyah seems to have been the first to introduce this distinction.

Rubūbīyah (Lordship)
This category of shirk refers to either the belief that others share Allah's lordship over creation as his equal or near equal or to the belief that there is no lord over creation at all.
 Shirk by association: the shirk concerned with associating "others" with Allah
 Shirk by negation: shirk in rubūbīyah (lordship)

Al-Asma wa's-Sifat (names and attributes)
This category of shirk includes both the non-believer practices of giving Allah the attributes of his creation and the act of giving Allah's names and attributes to created beings.
 Shirk by humanization: in this aspect of shirk, Allah is given the form and qualities of human beings and animals. Man's superiority over animals causes the human form to be more commonly used by idolaters to represent Allah in creation. Consequently, the image of the creator is often painted, molded, or carved in the shape of human beings possessing the physical features of those who worship them.
 Shirk by deification: this form of shirk relates to cases of created beings or things being given or claiming Allah's names or his attributes. For example, the ancient Arabs had the practice of worshiping idols whose names were derived from the names of Allah. The three main deities were Al-lāt (taken from Allah's name al-Elah), al-'Uzza (taken from al-'Aziz), and al-Manat (taken from al-Mannan). During the era of Muhammad, there was also a man in a region of Arabia called Yamamah, who claimed to be a prophet and took the name Rahman, which in Islam belongs only to Allah.

Al-'Ibadah (worship)
In this category of shirk, acts of worship are directed to others besides Allah, and the reward for worship is sought from the creation, instead of the creator. As in the case of the previous categories, shirk in al-'Ibadah has two main aspects.

This form of shirk occurs when any act of worship is directed to someone else besides Allah. It represents the most obvious form of idolatry against which the prophets were specifically sent by Allah and called the masses of mankind to give it up. Examples of this shirk are asking for forgiveness and admittance to paradise, which only Allah can provide, from others besides Allah.

Lesser shirk
Lesser shirk, or Shirke-e-Asghar. A person commits it by professing tawhid (there is no god except Allah) but having thoughts and actions that do not reflect that belief:

Mahmud ibn Lubayd reported, "Allah's messenger said: 'The thing I fear for you the most is ash-Shirk al-Asghar.'"
The companions asked, "O messenger of Allah, what is that?"
He replied, "Ar-Riya (showing off), for verily Allah will say on the Day of Resurrection when people are receiving their rewards, 'Go to those for whom you were showing off in the material world and see if you can find any reward from them.'"

Mahmud ibn Lubayd also said, "The Prophet came out and announced, 'O people, beware of secret Shirk!'"
The people asked, "O messenger of Allah, what is secret Shirk?"
He replied, "When a man gets up to pray and strives to beautify his prayer because people are looking at him; that is secret Shirk."

Umar ibn al-Khattab narrated that the Messenger of Allah said: "Whoever swears by other than Allah has committed an act of kufr or shirk." (graded hasan by Al-Tirmidhi and saheeh by Al-Hakim)

According to Ibn Mas’ood, one of Muhammad's companions said: "That I should swear by Allah upon a lie is more preferable to me than that I should swear by another upon the truth."

See also

 Black Stone
 Haram
 Henotheism
 Islam and blasphemy
 Islamic schools and branches
 Islamic view of the Trinity
 Islamic views on Jesus' death
 Paganism
 Pre-Islamic Arabia
 Shahada (confession)
 Taghut (idol)

Notes

References

External links

Shirk in legislation

Islamic terminology
Islamic theology
Polytheism
Sin
Idolatry